Perdóname may refer to:

Music
Perdóname (Eddy Lover album)
Perdóname, album by David Civera, 2005
Perdóname, album by Isaías Lucero, 2010

Songs
"Perdoname" (Ricky Martin song)
"Perdoname" (Demis Roussos song)
"Perdoname" (La Factoría song), featuring Eddy Lover
"Perdoname" (Pablo Alborán song)
"Perdóname", song by Nena Daconte with Argentinian composer Coti
"Perdóname", song by Dúo Dinámico, 1960s
"Perdóname", song by Luis Fonsi from Comenzaré, 1998
"Perdóname", song by Luis Segura
"Perdóname", song by Amaral
"Perdóname", song by norteño music group Bronco from album Sin Riendas
"Perdóname", song by Lucía Méndez, 1999
"Perdóname", Spanish version of "All by Myself" by Luis Miguel from the album Soy Como Quiero Ser, 1987 
"Perdóname", song by Selena from Selena Live!
"Perdóname", song by Gilberto Santa Rosa from Punto de Vista
"Perdóname", song by Yahir
"Perdóname" (with singer Coti)	Nena Daconte 2009 Number 20
"Perdóname", song by Texan band Del Castillo featuring Carl Thiel & Erik Hokkanen from album Brotherhood, 2006
"Perdóname", song by Bertin Osborne, 1983
"Perdóname", song by Camilo Sesto, 1980
"Perdóname", song by Luciano Pereyra, 2004
"Perdóname", song by Demis Roussos
"Perdóname", song by Fausto Rey
"Perdóname", song by Limi-T 21
"Perdóname", song by Pat Boone, 1958
"Perdóname", song by Robert Ledesma from album El Bolero Sentimientos de Hombre y Mujer
"Perdóname", song by El Trono de Mexico from album Que Bonita Es la Vida
"Perdóname", song by Deorro
"Perdóname", song by Raymix

See also
Perdóname Todo, a 1995 film directed by Raul Araiza
"Perdóname, perdóname", song Daniel Velázquez from Spain in the Eurovision Song Contest 1976 final
"Perdóname Otra Vez", song by Yolandita Monge from Historia de Amour 1981
"Perdóname Mi Amor", song by Conjunto Primavera nominated for Premio Lo Nuestro 2003
"Perdóname en Silencio", song by Reyli from Fe (Reyli album)